Redención (Spanish for "redemption") may refer to:

Music
Redención (danzón), composed by Orestes López
Redención (anthem), composed by Rosendo Ruiz Suárez
Redención (march), composed by Manuel Gregorio Tavárez

Film
Films known in Spanish as Redención:
Hummingbird (film), 2013
Southpaw (film), 2015
Tyrannosaur (film), 2011

See also
Redemption (disambiguation)
Redenzione (disambiguation)